Life Begins At Forty is a TVB series in 20 episodes. It stars Alex Fong, Chin Ka Lok, and Ram Tseung as three men in their forties and the issues they face as they enter middle age. Each has a story of their own but interconnects with the other two main characters.

Plot
Wei Fuk Wing, AKA "Ray", works at an advertising company called AW and has a contentious relationship with his new colleague, Kelly Kwan. Eventually, they fall in love and begin a relationship.

Chan Bing Gei was married, but his wife left several years ago. He runs a cram school and has unconditional, promiscuous sex with girls he meets at bars. Gei takes in a girl who claims to be his long-lost daughter Tung Tung and falls in love with his ex-wife's cousin.

Lo Ga Fai, an actor with small roles and big dreams, comes from a rich family and is bisexual. After his longtime boyfriend breaks up with him, Fai meets movie star Mok Hui Nam and they fall in love. Then Nam becomes pregnant with another man's baby and Fai discovers he has brain cancer. Not wanting to be a burden to them, Fai rejects his love for Nam and her baby.

Main cast
Alex Fong (方中信) as Wei Fuk Wing 韋福榮
Charmaine Sheh (佘詩曼) as Kwan Tze Kei 關子琪
Chin Ka Lok (錢嘉樂) as Chan Bing Gei 陳炳基
Anne Heung (向海嵐) as Mok Hui Nam 莫曉男
Ram Chiang (蔣志光) as Lo Ga Fai 羅家輝
Shirley Yeung (楊思琦) as Yuen Siu Mui 阮小梅

External links 
 

TVB dramas
2003 Hong Kong television series debuts
2004 Hong Kong television series endings